The Life of Surgeon Sauerbruch sometimes shortened to Surgeon Sauerbruch (German: Sauerbruch – Das war mein Leben) is a 1954 West German biographical drama film directed by Rolf Hansen and starring Ewald Balser, Heidemarie Hatheyer and Hilde Körber. It was shot at the Bavaria Studios in Munich and on location in West Berlin. It is based on surgeon Ferdinand Sauerbruch's memoirs Das war mein Leben, which were ghostwritten by Hans Rudolf Berndorff and were published in the German magazine Revue shortly before the release of the film. The film was shot from 26 September 1953 to 20 January 1954 in West Berlin, Munich, Frankfurt, and Hamburg. It premiered on 13 July 1954.

Plot 
Berlin, 1948: Olga Ahrends plunges to a streetcar and is seriously hurt. Professor Sauerbruch joins the scene and sends her into the surgical section of the Charité. As the incident is regarded to be an attempted suicide, Olga Ahrends is admitted into the psychiatric section.

A severe debate arises between Sauerbruch and the Charité psychiatrist, who diagnoses a falling sickness, while Sauerbruch recognizes that Olga Ahrends in fact is suffering from a metabolic disease weakening her bones. Olga Ahrends is in danger of being amputated her leg; Sauerbruch, however, is able to cure her by removing her parathyroid gland. Neither has she to be worried about the operation costs. Within this background story, many further episodes from Sauerbruch's life and work are shown, some of them in flashbacks.

During the Bavarian Soviet Republic, he unwaveringly stuck to his professional ethics. As a consequence, he was arrested in order not to be able to help the enemies of the revolution, but was rescued by a young man whose mother Sauerbruch once had operated on. On President Paul von Hindenburgs deathbed, Sauerbruch had to admit himself to the limitations of his profession and to calm down Hindenburg's fears that, after Hindenburgs death, Adolf Hitler, who had been appointed Chancellor of the German Empire by Hindenburg, would swear the army on himself, by telling Hindenburg that one only is able to decide situationally and that it is always easy for history to judge afterwards.

The flashback about another Sauerbruch patient is rather of funny nature. It is about a waiter who is worried about the costs he has to pay for his operation but then reacts confused and finally breathes a sigh of relief when he learns that he has just to pay a bill about 1 DM.

After end of work, Sauerbruch performs an operation on a male cat because its owner doesn't rely on veterinarians. Between operations, Sauerbruch gives lectures and examines young physicians. So, his time for private time is very limited. Mrs. Sauerbruch conforms uncomplainingly to his puritanic life style.

In further flashbacks, Sauerbruch tells about his invention, which makes thorax operations possible. During Sauerbruch's years of study, tuberculosis claimed many victims because it was not possible to perform operations on the patients' lungs. When a window in Sauerbruch's house was damaged during a storm, Sauerbruch came up with the idea of an underpressure chamber, the Sauerbruch chamber, which was to equalize pressure during opening the thorax. The first operation on an old woman failed, as she died. The second operation, however, which was performed on a young opera singer, showed that Sauerbruch had been right with his idea.

Also the Sauerbruch arm, which is a forearm prothesis constructed by Sauerbruch, is shown,  when Sauerbruch's wife presents him to one of his former patients, who has a Sauerbruch arm and, thus, is able to perform an organ concerto.

Cast 
Ewald Balser as Prof. Ferdinand Sauerbruch
Heidemarie Hatheyer as Olga Ahrends
Maria Wimmer as Mrs. Sauerbruch
Hilde Körber as Head nurse of the psychiatric section
Lina Carstens as Head nurse of the surgical section
Paul Bildt as Postman Wendlandt
Friedrich Domin as Paul von Hindenburg
Otto Gebühr as Sauerbruch's assistant
Ernst Waldow as waiter
Rudolf Vogel as waiter
Hans Christian Blech as Worker Brauer
Charles Regnier as Head of the psychiatric section
Wilhelm Borchert as railroader Ahrends
Erich Ponto as Head Physician of the psychiatric section
Claus Biederstaedt as Political commissar
Edith Schultze-Westrum as Sauerbruch's secretary
Paul Westermeier as Driver Elbell
Kurt Horwitz as Professor Johann von Mikulicz

Notes 
Originally, actor O. E. Hasse hoped to play Sauerbruch. Then, however, he was recompensed with the main part in the German 1954 film Canaris.

External links 
 

1954 films
1950s biographical films
German biographical films
West German films
1950s German-language films
German black-and-white films
Films set in Berlin
Films shot in Bavaria
Films directed by Rolf Hansen
Medical-themed films
Films set in the 1900s
Films set in the 1910s
Films set in the 1920s
Films set in the 1930s
Films set in the 1940s
Biographical films about physicians
Biographical films about surgeons
Cultural depictions of Paul von Hindenburg
Bavaria Film films
Films shot at Bavaria Studios
1950s historical films
German historical films
1950s German films